David John Rankin (June 20, 1903 – November 17, 1959) was a Scottish-Canadian politician who was a Member of Provincial Parliament in Legislative Assembly of Ontario from 1955 to 1959. He represented the riding of Frontenac—Addington for the Ontario Progressive Conservative Party. He was born in Collins Bay, Ontario and was a lawyer. He died at a hospital in Kingston, Ontario in 1959 and was buried at Cataraqui Cemetery.

References

External links

1903 births
1959 deaths
People from Kingston, Ontario
Progressive Conservative Party of Ontario MPPs